Cantagrel is a surname of French origin. Notable people with the surname include:

Gilles Cantagrel (born 1937), French musicologist, writer, lecturer, and music educator
René Cantagrel (born 1946), German-French poet, novelist, and painter

French-language surnames